Almaty District, is an administrative subdivision of the city of Astana, Kazakhstan. It was named after the city of Almaty.

Geography
Part of the mountainous Ile-Alatau National Park is in Almaty District.

References

External links
 Official website 

Districts of Astana